Peter Dale Wimbrow, usually known as Dale Wimbrow, (June 6, 1895 – January 26, 1954) was an American composer, radio artist and writer. He is best known for the poem, The Guy in the Glass, written in 1934.  Earlier in his career, he created several musical recordings in the still-young recording industry, and was known as "The Del-Mar-Va Songster".  He occasionally recorded with a quartet of musicians known as the "Rubeville Tuners", and he was also sometimes known as Peter Dale.

Biography

Early life and education
Peter Dale Wimbrow was born June 6, 1895, in Whaleyville, Maryland, the son of  Nutter Jerome Wimbrow (1867-1957) and Sallie Mary Wimbrow, née Dale (1873-1951). He studied at Western Maryland College until World War I, although no source can be supplied.

Career
Wimbrow's early career was in music and radio. Under his own name and as Old Pete Daley of Whaleysville, he became known for his records and radio performances with orchestras.  His credits include a number of recordings in the 1920s, in which he performed as the solo vocalist, and often as his own accompanist (on the ukulele).  The majority of those songs were his own creation, and he began turning to songwriting almost exclusively in the later part of the decade.  Perhaps his best-known musical composition was the 1930 jazz tune entitled "Accordion Joe".  Played by Duke Ellington's band, it appeared that same year as the soundtrack to an animated short film of the same name, starring Betty Boop.  The tune has appeared several times over the years in Duke Ellington compilation albums.

Wimbrow established the Indian River News newspaper in June 1948. It was published until September 1966, 12 years after his death in 1954, carried on by his wife.

The Guy in the Glass
Wimbrow wrote The Guy in the Glass for publication in The American Magazine in 1934. It is often mistitled The Man In The Glass. The poem became a popular clipping passed between people, and the author's credit was often dropped, leading to inquiries as to the author in newspapers as early as 1938.

Ann Landers printed the poem in her column on October 5, 1983, incorrectly attributing it to an anonymous man who died as a result of struggles with drug abuse. Landers received numerous letters that attributed or claimed different authorship of the poem, but only one of the letters published in her December 5, 1983, column correctly identified the author as Wimbrow and it was credited by Ann Landers as the true author.

Marriage and children
Wimbrow married Dorothy Livezy, a radio writer and producer. The couple had two children, Sally Dale Wimbrow and Peter Dale Wimbrow, Jr.

Death and afterward
Peter Dale Wimbrow died on January 26, 1954, in Sebastian, Florida and was interred at Dale Cemetery in Whaleyville, Maryland.

Dale Wimbrow Park, in Roseland, Florida, is named in his honor.

Dale Wimbrow in popular culture
The poem, The Guy in The Glass, was famously recited by Nigel Adkins, manager of Southampton Football Club in October 2012 during an interview with BBC South following a 4–1 defeat to West Ham United.

Published works

Print 
A Sardine and A Cracker (Washburn Printing Co., 1931)
Swamp Cabbage and Angel Wings (Stuart News, 1953)

Discography

References

External links
The Official Guy in the Glass Web Page

1895 births
1954 deaths
American newspaper publishers (people)
20th-century American poets
Songwriters from Maryland
People from Worcester County, Maryland
20th-century American musicians
People from Sebastian, Florida
Western Maryland College alumni